Muhammad Fajriyan Elbajrie (born 23 August 1997) is a Indonesia professional futsal player who plays for the club Indonesia Pro Futsal League, DB Asia Jabar.

Personal life
Fajriyan is from Karawang Regency, West Java. Precisely in West Cikampek Village, Cikampek District. Fajriyan is the youngest child of Machmud Chaerudin Salim's father and Endah Titi Subekti's mother.

Club career

APK Samarinda
Fajriyan started his professional futsal career with APK Samarinda in 2018.

FKM Lampung
In 2019, Fajriyan played at FKM Lampung after leaving APK Samarinda.

Bintang Timur Surabaya
Fajriyan joined Bintang Timur Surabaya in the 2020–21 season.

DB Asia Jabar
After leaving Bintang Timur Surabaya, in 2022 Fajriyan decided to play at DB Asia Jabar.

International career

Indonesia
Fajriyan made his international debut with Indonesia in the 2022 AFC Futsal Asian Cup in Kuwait. Fajriyan made history as the first Indonesian player to score hat-trick in the tournament.

References

External links 
 Muhammad Fajriyan on Bolalob

Indonesian men's futsal players
1997 births
Living people
People from Karawang Regency
21st-century Indonesian people